Fox grape is a common name which may refer to the following species of grapevine:

Vitis labrusca
Vitis vulpina (also called "frost grape")